London Brown is an American actor, dancer, comedian, radio host, and impressionist. Born in Los Angeles, California, Brown is best known for his appearance on the HBO series "Ballers" (2015–2019). As of 2021 Brown currently stars in STARZ Power Book III: Raising Kanan as Marvin Thomas.

Career
At the 2013 Black Comedy Awards in the UK, Brown won Best International Comedian.

Brown started his television career as "D" on Fuse's The Hustle.

As a stand-up comedian, Brown has shared the stage with various artists.

Filmography

Television

Film

References

External links
 www.iamlondonbrown.com. Official website

Living people
Year of birth missing (living people)
American male television actors
21st-century American comedians